Ionizer or ioniser may refer to:

 Air ioniser, a device that uses high voltage to ionise air molecules
 Water ionizer, an appliance that ionizes water